Institute for Research in Economics and Business Administration or SNF is a research institute that is associated with the Norwegian School of Economics and Business Administration (NHH) in Bergen, Norway. The institute performs commercial research related to economics and in particular energy, evaluation studies, fisheries, health economics, agricultural economics, regional business development, strategy and management as well as telecommunications, media and network economics.

SNF has between 30-40 full-time researchers as well as 20-30 assistants. In addition more than 100 researchers from NHH and the University of Bergen (UiB) have associated work with SNF. The institute is organized as a limited company that is owned by the foundation Stiftelsen SNF (80%), NHH (16%) and UiB (4%). The institute dates back to 1991 when three research institutes associated with NHH were merged. The limited company was founded in 2001.

Research institutes in Norway
Norwegian School of Economics
University of Bergen
Foundations based in Norway
Companies based in Bergen
Research institutes established in 1991
1991 establishments in Norway